The 1896 Harvard Crimson football team represented Harvard University in the 1896 college football season. The Crimson finished with a 7–4 record under first-year head coach Bert Waters. The team won its first six games, but lost four of the final five games, including losses to rivals Princeton and Penn.

Schedule

References

Harvard
Harvard Crimson football seasons
Harvard Crimson football
19th century in Boston